United Nations Security Council Resolution 211 was adopted on September 20, 1965. After the calls for a cease-fire in resolutions 209 and 210 went unheeded, the Council demanded that a cease-fire take effect at 0700 hours GMT on September 22 and that both forces withdraw to the positions held before August 5.  The Council requested the Secretary-General ensure the supervision of the cease-fire and called on all states to refrain from any action which might aggravate the situation.  The Council also decided that as soon as a cease-fire could be reached it would consider what steps could be taken to assist towards a settlement of the political problem underlying the conflict.

The resolution was adopted by ten votes to none, with Jordan abstaining.

See also
Indo-Pakistani War of 1965
Kashmir conflict
List of United Nations Security Council Resolutions 201 to 300 (1965–1971)

References

Text of the Resolution at undocs.org

External links
 

 0211
Indo-Pakistani War of 1965
 0211
September 1965 events